Eve Stratford and Lynne Weedon were murdered in separate, sexually motivated attacks during 1975 in London, England. Stratford (28 December 1953 – 18 March 1975) was a bunny girl and model. Weedon (11 November 1958 – 10 September 1975) was a schoolgirl who was killed almost six months later, on the other side of London. After Weedon's cold case was re-opened in 2004, new DNA techniques revealed that she and Stratford had been murdered by the same person. Stratford's case was re-opened in 2007, but neither case has been solved. A £40,000 reward for information leading to the capture of the killer remains on offer.

The murder occurred in almost identical circumstances, and police themselves linked the killings. The perpetrator is, therefore, likely to be an uncaught serial killer, a term usually used to describe repeat killers who have killed at least three victims.

Eve Stratford
Eve Stratford was born in Dortmund, West Germany in 1953 to Albert and Liza Stratford. Her mother was German, and met her father, an English medic in the Royal Army Medical Corps, in the 1940s. He was serving as part of the British Army of Occupation on the Rhine in the aftermath of the Second World War. As a youth Stratford won three beauty contests in Germany. The family moved around the world during Stratford's childhood, eventually settling in Aldershot, Hampshire. In 1972, she moved with her boyfriend Tony Priest, the lead singer of Onyx (later Vineyard), to Leyton, east London. Two other members of the band also shared the flat. At the time of her death, Stratford was a Playboy Club Bunny in Park Lane. She had started work at the club in 1973, recommended by a friend. She lived a glamorous lifestyle and regularly socialised with others, including famous figures such as Sid James and Eric Morecambe, and knew many other high-profile individuals. As a model she sometimes referred to herself as "Eva Von Bock" and was also known as "Bunny Ava".

In March 1975, only a few days before she was killed, Stratford appeared on the front cover of Mayfair magazine, an adult magazine for men, as "girl of the month". She was suspended for breach of contract by her club since she had posed for a rival publication. The magazine was said to be "on the top shelf of every newsagent in March that year". Police would later conclude that the magazine cover had likely enticed her killer.

Murders

Stratford
On Tuesday 18 March 1975, Stratford was found dead by her partner at their flat at 61a Lyndhurst Drive, Leyton. Her throat had been cut between eight and twelve times from ear to ear, while her neck and face were extensively mutilated, with detectives stating it was one of the most horrific murder scenes they had ever seen. She was found partially unclothed with a nylon stocking tied around one ankle and her hands were bound with a scarf. She was dressed only in a filmy pink bra and panties and a flimsy blue nylon negligee open at the front. There was a strong suggestion she had been sexually assaulted, and semen was found on vaginal swabs which indicated that she'd had sex shortly before her death. There was no sign of forced entry to the property, nor were there any signs of a struggle. A peculiar cloying scent was left by her attacker in the room where she was found.

Police found that on the day of her death, Stratford had visited Camden to see her agent and then went to a promotions consultancy in Bayswater. As far as detectives could tell, she had made the journey home on her own and was not seen with anybody else. She began to travel home at 3:30 p.m. and walked from Leytonstone tube station to her flat, last being seen by a neighbour walking towards her residence while wearing a floppy hat and holding some dried flowers. At 4:30  p.m., the women living below her flat heard a male and female voice talking, apparently calmly, followed by a thud and then the sound of footsteps. It was 5:20 p.m. when her boyfriend returned to find her dead.

The murder of the glamorous bunny girl featured prominently in the press.

Weedon
The killer struck again later that year. Sixteen-year-old schoolgirl Lynne Weedon was hit over the head with a blunt object and raped on 3 September 1975, six months after Stratford's murder and on the other side of London. That night she had gone out to celebrate her O-level results with friends at the Elm Tree pub on New Heston Road in Hounslow, near to where she lived in Lampton Road. She began to travel home at 11:00 p.m., parting company with her friends on the Great West Road before crossing over and continuing her journey home on her own through an alleyway named Short Hedges (now 'School Walk', it is used by pupils walking to the adjacent Lampton School). Weedon had previously vowed never to use the alleyway after dark as it was frequented by prowlers, but on the night she decided to take the shortcut. In this alleyway, at approximately 11:20 p.m., she was struck over the head with a heavy object similar to a piece of lead pipe, fracturing her skull. Her attacker then lifted her over gates and into the grounds of a power substation, before dragging her out of sight and raping her. She was discovered the next morning by the caretaker of the neighbouring school, Victor Voice, and despite her injuries was still alive; she died a week later in hospital without regaining consciousness.

Around the time of the murder, a man out walking his dog had seen a white male walking down the alleyway. Other witnesses described seeing a man, believed to be the same individual, running across the Great West road into the alleyway. It is believed that this man was Weedon's attacker.

Initial investigations
Police were convinced that the magazine piece Stratford had appeared in the same month she died had lured Stratford's sexually motivated killer to her. They believed that the killer had traced her address and then attacked her. That month's magazine featured naked photoshoots of her alongside an interview in which she concluded that she liked to be submissive sexually, stating:

She further commented that she found it "quite easy to turn men on" and "I do tend to flirt and tease rather a lot, I just get a kick out of turning men on". Her colleagues reportedly were shocked at her 'outspoken' comments about her sexual life. Police also noted that, although she had three housemates, she said in the article that she lived alone with her cat. Detectives believed she may have been spotted by her killer and followed home to her flat before being murdered. Stratford was said to have been upset about the Mayfair cover, believing it made her sound lesbian. Stratford was bisexual and stated in the article that she liked men and women.

The facts that there were no defence wounds and that no-one had heard any screams or shouts suggested Stratford knew her killer, but it was also considered that she could have been terrified enough to simply comply with the attacker's demands. The bouquet of flowers she was seen carrying home was found discarded in the hallway of the apartment ground-floor entrance and not up in her first-floor rooms, suggesting that she was confronted by her killer almost immediately after entering the house. It was also observed that the bouquet of dried flowers and grasses were similar to those Stratford had posed with in the Mayfair magazine cover.

Detectives considered the possibility that her killer was a secret lover she had invited round, but considered this unlikely, as she would have known that her boyfriend could have returned home at any time. However, there was also no sign of a forced entry. An alternative theory considered was that the attacker was a friend or acquaintance she may have let in.

Other bunny girls at Stratford's club were interviewed and it emerged that some had received obscene phone calls in the lead up to the murder. One girl, Marilyn Looms, had received death threats following her own nude centrefold in Mayfair. Detectives found that Stratford had herself received a number of intrusive phone calls in the days leading up to her death, in which the caller had either hung up without speaking or had whispered obscenities over the line. It was also discovered that she had received three mysterious phone calls on the very day she died. Each time she had answered the phone the caller said nothing and then cut the line dead.

Searches of nearby gardens, dust bins and drains following Stratford's murder failed to find the murder weapon, but did uncover a badly torn copy of the magazine which had featured Stratford days before her death (although other pornographic magazines were also found there). Two photofit pictures were released by detectives of two men seen in the vicinity of the murder site that day which officers wished to speak to. One was described as being in his late 30s or early 40s, of medium height with a peculiar limping gait and ruddy complexion. The other was about the same age but taller and with thick, black wavy hair. Nothing came of these photofit appeals.

Stratford had previously complained about a man who lurked near her house and followed her, but nothing was known of him other than her description of him as having a peculiarly strained and stiff walk. There were claims that an aggrieved Arab associate had tried to run Stratford down as she left her Park Lane club one night some months before her death, suggesting the man may have had a vendetta against her, but nothing came of this.

In October 1975 police in Liverpool found newspaper reports of Stratford's brutal killing smeared with lipstick in an empty bedsit. Also at the scene were magazine photos of the model, which appeared to have been stabbed with a dart. The landlord had discovered the items after cleaning up the flat after it was vacated by two male tenants.

By 1976 all leads had been exhausted by the original Stratford investigative team and the murder inquiry was wound down. The murder weapon was never found.

Cold case investigations

In 2004, the Weedon investigation was re-opened. In 2007, new DNA technology unexpectedly showed that the murders of Stratford and Weedon were committed by the same person. As a result of the link, Stratford's case was re-opened. Sixteen of the main suspects in the murders had their DNA taken, but none matched that of the killers. Both cases were featured in September 2007 on the BBC Crimewatch programme, where DCI Andy Mortimer stated that "without a shadow of a doubt" both murders were sexually motivated. It was noted that the attacker had, on both occasions, taken the weapon to the scene before taking it away with him, clearly indicating that they were pre-mediated attacks for sexual motivation. Mortimer stated that he was sure that the man seen going in to the alleyway in which Weedon was murdered was her attacker, and investigators believed that the man had stalked her as she walked from the Great West Road to the alleyway. Mortimer said that it was very unlikely that the killer had only committed these two murders and never committed another crime ever again, stating that the attacker probably committed offences both before and after the attacks. Operation Stealth, the police operation which has been investigating unsolved murders since 2008, received funding to continue work until the end of 2011.

On 25 March 2015, police issued a fresh appeal to coincide with the 40th anniversary of the murder of Stratford. One month later, in April, the murders were again featured on Crimewatch, on which it was revealed that a new £40,000 reward was on offer for information leading to the capture of the killer. Detectives noted that it was possible that the killer could have unknowingly committed crimes or gone to prison for other matters between the time of the murders and 1995, as it was only in this year that DNA began to be taken from individuals arrested of crimes. It was also stated that the killer would have had good knowledge of the 'Short Hedges' ('School Walk') alleyway in which Weedon was attacked, and that he would have been a white male between the ages of 17 and 30 (between 63 and 77 in 2023). It was asserted that psychiatrists, probation officers, cellmates or prison guards could hold the information needed to identify the killer, as he may have made an admission or disclosure to these people over the years regarding the murders. The lead detective also told The Guardian: "It's inconceivable the killer of Eve and Lynne has kept the perfect secret for 40 years. It's a heavy burden to carry and he must have let details slip over the years—maybe to a partner, a friend, even a cellmate—and I would appeal to anyone with information to contact us."

In September 2015, the police made a further appeal for new information on the murders.

Other linked cases

Murder of Elizabeth Parravincina

In the early hours of 9 September 1977, almost two years to the day since the death of Lynne Weedon, 27-year-old Elizabeth Parravincina (sometimes spelled Elizabeth Parravicini) was murdered only a mile away from the site of Weedon's attack. The murders occurred in similar circumstances, and it was immediately announced that the killings of Weedon and Parravincina could be linked. Just as in the case with Weedon, Parravincina had walked home late at night along the Great West Road before turning right into Osterley Road, where she was attacked. Having walked past St Mary's Church and the playing fields of Isleworth Grammar School (now Isleworth and Syon School) she drew level with the driveway of the private Parkfield Housing Estate where she lived, when she was suddenly attacked from behind my a man who hit her with a blunt instrument, as in Weedon's killing. Parravincina's skull was likewise instantly fractured and the killer similarly dragged her body away from the street and into shrubbery. Although in Parravincina's case there was no sign of sexual interference, detectives believed that Elizabeth's attacker had been disturbed and had fled before interfering with her body.

Similarly to Eve Stratford, Parravincina was blonde and described as "a very striking woman". In the aftermath of the murder, the Metropolitan Police themselves said that there may have been a link to Weedon's killing, stating: "There are similarities with the murder of Lynne Weedon which are being considered".

A large police hunt was launched in response to Parravincini's murder, and a photofit picture of a suspect was released, leading to more than 60 calls being made to police by the public. In January 1978 the lead detective, Detective Chief Superintendent Chris Draycott, said that there were "quite a few possibles which are being worked on at the moment".

In 1983 it was revealed that detectives had interviewed a jailed policeman as part of an inquiry into the murders of three women, including Weedon and Parravincina. The policeman, Paul Thomas, had been jailed for five and a half years for sex crimes, and was said to have "led a secret life of kinky sex, terrorising schoolgirls". He reportedly prowled the streets in the area at night wearing a hood and dark clothes. He was also known to have harassed women with anonymous phone calls, as Stratford was in the weeks before she was killed. Thomas was interviewed after his arrest for the other crimes, and was questioned routinely about the death of Elizabeth Parravincina. However, he was reported to have produced "a satisfactory alibi".

In 2007, when the DNA link between Stratford's and Weedon's killings was discovered, it was reported that detectives expected DNA to also reveal a link to Parravincina's murder. Scotland Yard were quoted as saying "a serial killer was probably on the loose".

Murder of Patsy Morris

Links have also been suggested between Weedon and Parravincina's murders and that of Patsy Morris, another local schoolgirl who was killed less than 2.5 miles away from Weedon at Hounslow Heath in 1980. Immediately after Morris's killing, it was noted in the press that she had been the third girl to be murdered in the area in the last 5 years, following the murders of Weedon and Parravincina in 1975 and 1977, respectively. Morris, 14, had gone missing from the area on 16 June of that year, and two days later was found half-naked and face down in undergrowth on the Heath, with her clothing pushed upwards over her body. This suggested a sexual motivation to the killing, as in Weedon's case, although there was in fact no sign of sexual assault or rape. As well as the proximity to Weedon's attack five years previously and to other attacks on women in the area, such as that of Elizabeth Parravincina in 1977, Morris had been tied up in a similar fashion to Eve Stratford, who the murderer of Weedon was also known to have killed. A pair of tights with one leg missing was tied around her leg and wound upwards until it knotted four times around her neck, acting as a ligature. Stratford had, like Morris, been found with her hands tied behind her back with the leg of one of her stockings, with the other leg similarly tied around her ankle.

Soon after Morris was found dead, her father received a phoned death threat from an unidentified teenage boy. The call was from a local caller with a local-sounding voice.

In 2008, it was revealed that Morris had been the childhood girlfriend of west London serial killer Levi Bellfield, an Isleworth-born man who lived nearby at the time of the killing and who had just been convicted of two murders and an attempted murder in the area. These attacks had been committed between 2003 and 2004 in the vicinity of the Morris murder site. It was also reported that police were investigating a possible confession to the murder made by Bellfield, alleged to have been made to a cellmate while on remand. Bellfield would have been 12 years old at the time of Morris's murder, which occurred a year before he received his first conviction, for burglary, aged 13. He was known to have repeatedly played truant while at school and was known to often frequent Hounslow Heath when he should have been at school. He was known to have not attended school on the day of the murder of Morris. Former partners of Bellfield recounted that he had a hatred of blonde women and targeted them for attacks, and it was noted that Morris was herself blonde. Some claimed that Morris's death could have been the start of Bellfield's violent obsession with blondes.

After it was revealed that Bellfield was being investigated by police for his daughter's murder, Morris's father stated that he was certain that the teenage boy who had given him a death threat in a call at the time was Bellfield, saying: "He's a local man, which is why it could be him. And it's terrifying to think that someone of twelve or thirteen could have done it".

Disproven links to other cases

Murder of Lynda Farrow
In 2005, before the DNA link between Stratford's and Weedon's murders was discovered, there was media speculation linking the murders of Stratford and Lynda Farrow, a 29-year-old mother of two who had her throat cut in her own home whilst heavily pregnant on 19 January 1979. A man who had been waiting outside Farrow's home discreetly followed her into the house after she came back from a shopping trip, before slitting her throat and quickly escaping out of the back door. Links were suggested between Stratford's and Farrow's cases because both had their throats cut and both had worked at West End nightspots. Farrow had worked at the International Sports Club in Mayfair, where boxing matches were held. It was also widely reported that neither of them had been sexually assaulted, although evidence had actually suggested that Stratford had engaged in sex shortly before she died. Stratford and Farrow had lived 5 miles apart.

When the DNA link between Stratford's and Weedon's murders was revealed in 2007, it was reported that detectives believed that DNA could also prove a link to Farrow's killing. Police extracted a DNA profile of Farrow's killer and uploaded it onto the National DNA Database to check whether there was a link to Stratford's murder, but the tests showed that Stratford's and Farrow's murders were not linked, and that there was no match between the DNA found in Farrow's case to any other crime. This indicated that there was no evidence to connect the murders. The lead detective on the case, Rebecca Hamilton, confirmed the existence of forensic evidence in Farrow's case on Crimewatch in January 2009. It was also revealed on Crimewatch that a suspect in Farrow's murder was her ex-husband, who she had left one year prior to her death to begin a relationship with a new boyfriend, being pregnant with the new boyfriend's child when she was murdered. The ex-husband was described as "not at all happy" with Farrow having started a new life with a new boyfriend and having a baby with him. It was stated that one line of inquiry had been that the ex-husband had arranged a contract killing of his pregnant former wife in her house. The ex-husband had died by 2009, and detectives appealed on Crimewatch for information from anyone who now felt they could come forward to confirm whether he was involved.

Despite this, in 2022 former Metropolitan Police detective Colin Sutton, who led the high-profile investigations into Levi Bellfield and Delroy Grant, claimed that Farrow's murder could be linked to Stratford's and Weedon's. Sutton had previously carried out a cold case review of the evidence in Farrow's case on behalf of the Met in 2002 (before the DNA evidence was discovered in the cases which showed they were not linked) and said he was struck by the similarities he saw. He said the cases of Stratford and Farrow were similar as both had their throat cut in their own home. Sutton's claims come despite the fact that Farrow and Stratford's murders were found not to be linked by DNA. His claims were promoted in advance of a book about the case he is due to publish with John Blake Publishing, titled The West End Girls. A documentary based on this book and promoting Sutton's claims is also due to be released in 2022, titled West End Girls: The Search for a Serial Killer.

Peter Sutcliffe a.k.a. the "Yorkshire Ripper"

In 2015, amateur crime investigators Chris Clark and Tim Tate published a book titled Yorkshire Ripper: The Secret Murders, in which they claimed Stratford's and Weedon's murders could be linked to infamous serial killer Peter Sutcliffe, commonly known as the Yorkshire Ripper. In the book, it was accepted that the murder of Stratford bore almost no similarities to Sutcliffe's known murders, which were usually carried out against prostitutes with a hammer and were all committed in the north of England. However, since Stratford's murder was known to have been committed by the same person that killed Lynne Weedon, the authors claimed that the killer must have been Sutcliffe, since Weedon's murder bore some similarities to his murders. They also alleged that the murders of Parravincina, Farrow and Morris could have been committed by Sutcliffe. However, the DNA profile of the killer is known in the Stratford, Weedon and Farrow cases, and the police are known to already have a copy of Sutcliffe's DNA and have been able to rule him out of unsolved murders as a result, such as in the Lesley Molseed case. Upon Sutcliffe's death in 2020, Clark submitted a Freedom of Information request to the Home Office, asking if Sutcliffe's DNA was on the national DNA database. The Home Office confirmed that it was, indicating that Sutcliffe can be ruled out of unsolved murder cases in which there is existing DNA evidence, such as in the Farrow, Stratford and Weedon cases. Notably, the murders of Stratford and Weedon, as well as the cases of Parravincina, Farrow and Morris, did not feature in the subsequent 2022 ITV documentary based on Clark and Tate's book.

Legacy
The site of Weedon's murder remains largely unchanged today. The alleyway is now commonly referred to as 'School Walk' and is used by those walking to the adjacent Lampton School (it was the caretaker of this school that found Weedon's body in 1975). The electricity sub-station where she was found remains, as does the fence she was thrown over by her attacker.

See also
List of unsolved murders in the United Kingdom
Chris Clark – a crime writer who claimed in Yorkshire Ripper: The Secret Murders that Stratford and Weedon were killed by Peter Sutcliffe (despite the DNA evidence)
Murders of Jacqueline Ansell-Lamb and Barbara Mayo
Colin Campbell – killer of two young women in sexually motivated attacks in west London in the early 80s
Murders of Kate Bushell and Lyn Bryant – two other UK unsolved murders which police believe may be linked

UK cold cases where the offender's DNA is known:
Murder of Deborah Linsley
Murder of Lindsay Rimer
Murder of Janet Brown
Murder of Linda Cook 
Murder of Melanie Hall
Batman rapist – subject to Britain's longest-running serial rape investigation

References

Bibliography

External links
          2007 Crimewatch appeal on the murders of Stratford and Weedon, revealing a DNA link between the cases
           2015 Crimewatch appeal on the murders of Stratford and Weedon, which revealed a new £40,000 reward for information
         2009 Crimewatch appeal on the murder of Lynda Farrow
                    2021 Channel 5 documentary that features a section on the murder of Patsy Morris (04:14-07:10)

1970s murders in London
1975 in London
1975 murders in the United Kingdom
20th-century English criminals
Criminals from London
Deaths by person in London
History of the London Borough of Hounslow
History of the London Borough of Waltham Forest
English male criminals
English murderers of children
English rapists
Female murder victims
Fugitives wanted by the United Kingdom
Leyton
March 1975 crimes
March 1975 events in the United Kingdom
Rape in London
Rape in the 1970s
September 1975 crimes
September 1975 events in the United Kingdom
Unidentified British criminals
Unidentified British rapists
Unidentified British serial killers
Serial murders in the United Kingdom
Stabbing attacks in London
Unsolved murders in London
Victims of serial killers
Violence against women in England